The Tofiq Bahramov Republican Stadium is a multi-purpose stadium in Baku, Azerbaijan. It is currently used mostly for football matches. It served as the home ground for the Azerbaijan national football team until they moved to the  Baku Olympic Stadium. It holds 31,200 seats making it the second largest stadium in the country. The stadium is also used by the Azerbaijan Premier League clubs in the final rounds of European competitions.

History 
The Tofiq Bahramov Republican Stadium was built in 1951. Its construction started before World War II in 1939, but was suspended. When its construction resumed, it was finished by German prisoners of war. Initially the stadium was named after Joseph Stalin (1878–1953) and built in form of C (Cyrillic: Cтaлин). After the 20th Congress of the Communist Party of the Soviet Union in 1956 it was renamed after Vladimir Lenin (1870–1924) as a part of de-Stalinization. In 1993, the stadium was named after the famous football referee Tofiq Bahramov (1925–1993) who died in the same year.

In 2011, the Presidential Reserve Fund of the State Budget of Azerbaijan for 2011 allocated $10 million for capital repairs and reconstruction of the stadium as it could be used as potential venue for Eurovision Song Contest 2012.  During a reconstruction process, the number of seats were increased from 29870 to 31200 and the grass cover football stadium was properly renewed according to FİFA standards. In addition, the projectors which were used to light the stadium were also renewed with innovative and modern technologies. President Ilham Aliyev attended the opening of the Tofig Bahramov Republican Stadium after major overhaul and reconstruction on 16 August 2012.

The stadium was one of the venues for the group stages of the 2012 FIFA U-17 Women's World Cup. One Group A match, a semi-final and the final were played there.

Events
The athletics competitions of the European Youth Olympic Festival (EYOF) was held at the stadium between July 22 and 27, 2019.

The stadium also hosted archery at 2015 European Games.

Aside from sporting uses, several concerts have been played at Tofiq Bahramov, with such big names as Shakira, Elton John, Jennifer Lopez and Tarkan playing.

Concerts

Gallery

See also

List of football stadiums in Azerbaijan
Baku Olympic Stadium
Tofiq Bahramov

References

Football venues in Baku
Athletics (track and field) venues in Azerbaijan
Azerbaijan
Football venues in the Soviet Union
Athletics (track and field) venues in the Soviet Union
Sports venues completed in 1951
Neftçi PFK
Multi-purpose stadiums in Azerbaijan
2015 European Games venues